Khind Holdings Berhad (Khind) is a producer and marketer of home consumer electrical appliances and industrial electrical company with revenue of RM325 million in 2013. Listed on Bursa Malaysia since 1998, Khind employs over 800 staff with 11 branch offices in Malaysia and a manufacturing plant in Sekinchan, Selangor.  With operations in the ASEAN region, Middle East, North Africa and Europe – Khind exports to over 60 countries around the world.

The company produces a wide range of home consumer electrical appliances ranging from: fans, emergency lanterns, rice cookers and steamers, to small home kitchen appliances under the Khind and Mistral brands, and is also the official marketing company for international brands such as: Ariston (Home water heating equipment); Honeywell, Mistral (air cooling devices) in Malaysia.  Regionally, through its subsidiaries, Khind is also a marketer for high-end home consumer appliance brands like: KitchenAid, Ariston and Bugatti; while its industrial electrical solutions subsidiaries help distribute brands such as Relite (a specialist air cooling brand) and Swisher (specialist in industrial cleaning solutions) and Augier (medium voltage transformers).

References

1961 establishments in Malaya
Companies listed on Bursa Malaysia
Companies based in Shah Alam
Electronics companies of Malaysia
Home appliance manufacturers
Malaysian brands